Molière Award for Best Director. Winners and nominees.

 1987 : Jean-Pierre Vincent for The Marriage of Figaro  (Le Mariage de Figaro)
Robert Hossein, for Kean
Jorge Lavelli, for A Midsummer Night's Dream  (Le Songe d'une nuit d'été)
Sophie Loucachevski, for Madame de Sade
Pierre Mondy, pour Two into One  (C'est encore mieux l'après-midi)
Jérôme Savary, pour Cabaret
 1988 : Laurent Terzieff pour Fall  (Ce que voit Fox)
Robert Hossein for L'Affaire du courrier de Lyon
Bernard Murat for L'Éloignement
Antoine Vitez for The Satin Slipper  (Le Soulier de satin)
Georges Wilson for Je ne suis pas Rappaport
 1989 : Patrice Chéreau for Hamlet
Maurice Benichou for Une absence
Jorge Lavelli for Réveille-toi Philadelphie
Pierre Mondy for La Présidente
Jean-Pierre Vincent for Le Faiseur de théâtre
 1990 : Gérard Caillaud for Les Palmes de Monsieur Schutz
Luc Bondy for The Lonely Way (Le Chemin solitaire)
Matthias Langhoff for Miss Julie  (Mademoiselle Julie)
Jorge Lavelli for Greek
Jean-Pierre Miquel for The Supper  (Le Souper)
 1991 : Peter Brook for The Tempest  (La Tempête)
Philippe Adrien for The Annunciation of Marie  (L'Annonce faite à Marie)
Alain Françon for The Girl from Maxim's  (La Dame de chez Maxim)
Jorge Lavelli for Heldenplatz
Georges Wilson for Eurydice
 1992 : Stéphan Meldegg for Cuisine et dépendances
Patrice Chéreau for Time and the Room  (Le Temps et la chambre)
Jorge Lavelli for Comédies barbares
Marcel Maréchal for Mr Puntila and his Man Matti (Maître Puntila et son valet Matti)
Bernard Murat for Célimène et le Cardinal
 1993 : Laurent Terzieff for Another Time (Temps contre temps)
André Engel for Légendes de la forêt viennoise
Matthias Langhoff for Désir sous les ormes
Jorge Lavelli for Macbett
Jean-Louis Martinelli for L'Eglise
 1994 : Benno Besson for Quisaitout et Grobêta
Jean-Luc Boutté for La Volupté de l'honneur
Terry Hands for Hamlet
Patrice Kerbrat for Ce qui arrive et ce qu'on attend
Gérard Vergez for The Visitor  (Le Visiteur)
 1995 : Alain Françon for The War Plays  (Pièces de guerre)
Patrice Kerbrat for "Art"
Stephan Meldegg for Un air de famille
Jean-Michel Ribes for Brèves de comptoir
Régis Santon for Business is business  (Les Affaires sont les affaires)
 1996 : Patrice Chéreau for In the Solitude of Cotton Fields  (Dans la solitude des champs de coton)
Benno Besson for Lapin lapin
Adrian Brine for An Ideal Husband  (Un mari idéal)
Jorge Lavelli for Décadence
Stephan Meldegg, Rita Russek for Scènes de la vie conjugale
 1997 : Alain Sachs for Le Passe-muraille
Gildas Bourdet for The Two Venetian Twins  (Les Jumeaux vénitiens)
Patrice Kerbrat for Waiting for Godot  (En attendant Godot)
Didier Long for Le Roman de Lulu
Roman Polanski for Master Class
 1998 : Jean-Louis Benoît for Les Fourberies de Scapin
Benno Besson for Le Roi cerf
Marion Bierry for L'Écornifleur
Patrice Kerbrat for Uncle Vanya  (Oncle Vania)
Stephan Meldegg for Popcorn
 1999 : Gildas Bourdet for L'Atelier
Nicolas Briançon for Jacques and His Master  (Jacques et son maître)
Patrice Kerbrat for Tout contre
Didier Long for Miss Else  (Mademoiselle Else)
Jean-Michel Ribes for Rêver peut-être
 2000 : Ariane Mnouchkine for Tambours sur la digue
Marcel Bluwal for A torts et à raisons
Gildas Bourdet for Raisons de famille
Irina Brook for Morphic Resonance  (Résonances)
Jacques Echantillon for Accidental Death of an Anarchist  (Mort accidentelle d'un anarchiste)
 2001 : Irina Brook for Beast on the Moon  (Une bête sur la Lune)
Benno Besson for The Caucasian Chalk Circle  (Le Cercle de craie caucasien)
Étienne Bierry for Les Directeurs
Marcel Bluwal for Le Grand Retour de Boris S
Didier Long for Becket or The Honor of God  (Becket ou l'Honneur de Dieu)
 2002 : Jean-Jacques Zilbermann for The Shop Around the Corner  (La Boutique au coin de la rue)
Annick Blancheteau for La Griffe (A71)
Patrice Kerbrat for Elvire
Didier Long for Jalousie en trois fax
Alain Sachs for Madame Sans-Gêne
 2003 : Stéphane Hillel for Un petit jeu sans conséquence
Peter Brook for Le Costume
Didier Caron for Un vrai bonheur
Patrice Chéreau for Phèdre
John Malkovich for Hysteria
 2004 : Zabou Breitman for L'Hiver sous la table
Stephan Meldegg, for Des cailloux plein les poches
José Paul, for Things We Do for Love  (L'amour est enfant de salaud)
Yves Pignot, for ...Comme en 14 !
Jean-Luc Tardieu, for Signé Dumas
 2005 : Didier Bezace for The Browning Version (La Version de Browning)
Irina Brook for L'Île des esclaves
André Engel for Le Jugement dernier
Stéphane Hillel for Amadeus
Jean-Luc Moreau for Camille C.
Jean-François Sivadier for Italienne scène et orchestre
 2006 : James Thiérrée for The Junebug Symphony  (La Symphonie du hanneton)
Agnès Boury and José Paul for La Sainte Catherine
Nicolas Briançon for Pygmalion
Hans-Peter Cloos for Le Caïman
André Engel for King Lear  (Le Roi Lear)
Hélène Vincent for Creditors  (Créanciers)
 2007 : Denis Podalydès for Cyrano de Bergerac
Marion Bierry for L'Illusion Comique
Agnès Boury and José Paul for Chocolat piment
Didier Long for The Caretaker (Le Gardien)
Jean-Luc Revol for Le Cabaret des hommes perdus
 2008 : John Malkovich for Good Canary
Luc Bondy for La Seconde Surprise de l'amour
Alain Françon for L'Hôtel du libre échange
Didier Long for The Life Before Us  (La Vie devant soi)
 2009 : Christian Schiaretti for Coriolanus   (Coriolan)
 Stéphane Braunschweig for Tartuffe
 Benoît Lavigne for Baby Doll
 Christophe Lidon for Le Diable rouge
 Didier Long for Equus
 Stanislas Nordey for Incendies
 2010 : Alain Françon for The Cherry Orchard (La Cerisaie)
 Nicolas Briançon for Twelfth Night (La Nuit des rois)
 Éric Métayer for The 39 Steps (Les 39 marches)
 Jean-Luc Moreau for L’Illusion conjugale
 Claude Régy for Ode maritime
 Jean-François Sivadier for The Girl from Maxim's (La Dame de chez Maxim)
 2011 : Julien Sibre for Le Repas des fauves
 Philippe Adrien for Sauce for the Goose (Le Dindon)
 Patrice Chéreau for Autumn Dream (Rêve d’Automne)
 Marcial Di Fonzo Bo for La Mère
 Bernard Murat for Le Prénom
 Joël Pommerat for Ma chambre froide

External links
 Official website 

French theatre awards
French awards
Molière